Sammy Chand is a record producer, soundtrack composer, artist, and entrepreneur. He is also the founder of Rukus Avenue, a South Asian record label based in Los Angeles, CA.

Career
Sammy has transformed both the musical landscape and the South Asian community with a storied career spanning over two decades. In 1996, he laid the foundation for Rukus Avenue, as an independent record label and platform for an emerging scene of South Asian musicians in North America. This seminal company was at the forefront of a community-driven movement to establish a new identity for South-Asian Americans, that were charged with the task of reconciling traditional cultural values with American ones. Chand had made a name for himself in the world of film and television through a lengthy list of placements.  Under his leadership, the label gained an international presence, beginning with a landmark distribution deal with Sony Music in India and a more recent global agreement with The Orchard.

Early releases such as Passage to India (Various, 2001) and The Movement (Karmacy, 2005), helped to cement Chand's status as dynamic music producer and cultural ambassador.  His solo debut, Tale of a Crown (2010) further demonstrates his ability to pair original musical elements found in South Asian music with a variety of other genres - a Chand signature.

Throughout his career, Chand and his music have built a formidable bond with the film and television community. His notable placements include CBS News, PBS, The Oprah Winfrey Show,  America's Most Wanted, Leela, So You Think You Can Dance?, Anthony Bourdain's No Reservations and the Weather Channel's Storm Riders. In 2008, he partnered with the Indian Film Festival of Los Angeles to bring a live musical component to the festival that would properly articulate the intimate relationship between music and film in Indian Cinema. The IFFLA Rhythm Village and IFFLA Rhythm Village Unplugged under his direction, have become highly popular additions to the annual festival.

Today, Chand is further advancing this movement and his sound with the third generation of Rukus Avenue artists. He is currently producing the debut from Elephants With Guns, an eclectic band that, “collects music, sounds and noises from different parts of the world, wraps them in twine, and presents them to you.”  He is also currently writing and recording material for Blood and Treasure, the follow-up to Tale of a Crown. Chand currently resides in Los Angeles.

Discography

Solo albums
 Passage to India (2001)
 Tale of a Crown (2010)

Collaborations
 Karmacy - The Movement (2005)
 Rasika - Sari (W)rap (2010)

Music Placements

 The Oprah Winfrey Show (ABC)
 America's Most Wanted - multiple (FOX)
 So You Think You Can Dance (FOX)
 Fetch! With Ruffman Ruff (Fox)
 CBS News
 No Reservations With Anthony Bourdain (travel)
 PBS Newshour
 Bizarre Foods (travel)
 Cupcake Wars (food)
 CMJ New Music CD
 NBA/ India day LA Clippers Campaign
 PETA India Campaign
 Talking heads - (ABC)Australia
 Steven and Chris - Canada
 Ne Dites Pas A Mere - multiple- France
 People's Du Feu Philippines - France
 Alberta Primetime - Canada
 E! Talk - Canada
 Sentinelles De La Nature - France
 Living Halifax, Toronto, Saskatchewan, Vancouver - Canada
 Delhi Daka - France

 Storm Riders - (Weather Channel)
 Haravak Aruts - Israel
 Hisardut Haphilipinim - Israel
 Travels to the Edge with Art W - Canada
 Frat Party - movie
 American Desi - movie
 American Chai - movie
 Bride and Prejudice - movie
 Leela - movie
 Wheres the party yaar - movie
 NBC summer Olympics Commercials 2004
 Friday Night Lights (NBC)
 Quarter Life Crisis - movie
 Universal Music Urban Fusion
 Current TV
 Bellytwins Bollywood DVD workout
 Bellytwins Bhangra DVD workout
 Virgin Airlines inflight music
 KTLA Morning News

References

External links
Rukus Avenue
iTunes
IMDb 
Facebook

1975 births
Living people
American record producers